Edoardo Sbampato (born 5 February 1998) is an Italian football player. He plays for  club Legnago.

Club career
He made his Serie C debut for Virtus Francavilla on 4 February 2018 in a game against Rende.

On 30 July 2019, he signed a 2-year contract with Paganese.

References

External links
 

1998 births
Sportspeople from the Province of Verona
Footballers from Veneto
Living people
Italian footballers
Association football defenders
A.C. ChievoVerona players
U.S. Alessandria Calcio 1912 players
Virtus Francavilla Calcio players
Paganese Calcio 1926 players
F.C. Legnago Salus players
Serie C players
Serie D players